Al `Amiriyah  is a town in the Amman Governorate of northern Jordan.

References

Populated places in Amman Governorate